Old Sun Community College is a community college owned and operated by First Nations that provides post-secondary education and training in Siksika 146, Alberta, Canada to members of the Siksika Nation.

Partnerships
Old Sun Community College is a member of the First Nation & Adult Higher Education Consortium, a non-profit organization in Western Canada, which coordinates the efforts of its members to provide quality adult and higher education, controlled entirely by people of the First Nations.

History
The main campus building was used as a Residential School for Blackfoot children from 1929-1971. From 1971-1976, the College was operated as a campus of Mount Royal College.  In 1978, Old Sun Community College became an independent institution operated by the Blackfoot Band. The College was named in honour of Chief Old Sun (1819-1897) who served as a medicine man, warrior, and leader of one of the largest of the Blackfoot Confederacy bands. In Blackfoot, Chief Old Sun’s name NA TO SA PI translates to ‘Sun Elder’ or ‘Sun Old Man’ which implies ‘to see’, or 'to gain insight'.

Since the 1980s, Old Sun Education has evolved from a small upgrading program into Old Sun Community College, a centre offering accredited post-secondary courses, certificates, diplomas and degrees via partnerships with recognized colleges and universities, in particular the University of Calgary and Bow Valley College.

Academics
Students are instructed by Professors from affiliated Universities and Colleges. Some of the academic programs offered at Old Sun Community College are as follows:
 Adult Basic Education (ABE)
 Academic Upgrading
 Bachelor of General Studies
 Blackfoot language classes, 
 Bow Valley College LPN Diploma Program
 University & College Preparation (UCEPP)
 University outreach program,  
 University of Calgary outreach program
 University Studies Diploma (USD)
 Master of Education Degree
 Off Campus Student Support
 Prior Learning Assessment & Recognition (PLAR) Program
 Summer programs

Scholarships and bursaries
The Government of Canada sponsors an Aboriginal Bursaries Search Tool that lists over 680 scholarships, bursaries, and other incentives offered by governments, universities, and industry to support Aboriginal post-secondary participation.

See also
List of tribal colleges and universities

External links
Official website

References

Colleges in Alberta
Indigenous universities and colleges in North America
First Nations education
Community colleges
Educational institutions established in 1971
1971 establishments in Alberta